Antz Racing  is a 2001 video game for the Game Boy Color, developed by RFX Interactive and published by Light and Shadow Production with Acclaim Entertainment co-publishing in North America and Electronic Arts co-publishing in Europe. The game is a kart racing game based on the 1998 film Antz.

Gameplay

 

Antz Racing features kart racing between six characters from the film across two modes of play. In '4 Seasons', players compete in a tournament spanning across eight courses from locations in the film, including Anthill, Forest Park, Frozen Pond and the City. 'Quick Race' allows players to play individual circuits. As players race around the tracks, they collect bonuses and weapons, including speed, invincibility, and missiles. Vehicles contain a damage meter that can lead to vehicles being lost if filled when running over obstacles or attacked by other racers. The game also features Game Link Cable support, allowing players to compete in races.

Development   

Electronic Arts acquired the Antz license in 2000 following the acquisition of Dreamworks Interactive, leading to initial development of Antz Racing by Light & Shadow Productions. However, in January 2001, Electronic Arts announced the publisher would no longer be releasing Antz Racing. After several months in limbo, Acclaim Entertainment announced they would publish Antz Racing at E3 2001.

Reception 

Antz Racing received lukewarm reviews. Pocket Games stated the game was a "decent kart racer", praising the "high-color introductions and fluid cartoon graphics." Game Boy Xtreme stated the game had "great graphics", whilst noting "it's difficult to anticipate the corners properly."

References

External links

2001 video games
Acclaim Entertainment games
Antz video games
Game Boy Color games
Game Boy Color-only games
Kart racing video games
Multiplayer and single-player video games
RFX Interactive games
Video games set in New York City